Mirzo Rizo is a jamoat in Tajikistan. It is part of the city of Hisor in Districts of Republican Subordination. The jamoat has a total population of 31,826 (2020; 25,971 — 2015)

References

Populated places in Districts of Republican Subordination
Jamoats of Tajikistan